The Leinster Junior Football Championship is a junior "knockout" competition in the game of Gaelic football played in the province of Leinster in Ireland. The series of games are organised by the Leinster Council. The competition began in 1906, with Wicklow winning during the inaugural year. The most successful county to date is Dublin who have won on twenty occasions. The current (2017) Leinster junior football champions are Meath.

The winners of the Leinster Junior Football Championship each year progress to play the other provincial champions for a chance to win the All-Ireland Junior Football Championship.

2007

Top winners

Roll of honour

(* 1924 Longford awarded the title following an objection to Meath playing a Senior player. )

See also
 Munster Junior Football Championship
 Connacht Junior Football Championship
 Ulster Junior Football Championship

References

Sources
 Leinster Junior Football Roll of Honour
 Final Results 1905–1999
 Roll of Honour on gaainfo.com

 
 3
2